Bridge and Tunnel (often abbreviated B&T or BNT) is a term – often used pejoratively – to describe people who live in communities surrounding the island of Manhattan in New York City, and commute to it for work or entertainment. It refers to the fact that vehicular travel to the island of Manhattan requires passing over a bridge or through a tunnel. Some use it to describe residents of the other four boroughs of New York City – Brooklyn, Queens, the Bronx, and Staten Island – but it typically refers to those who travel into the city from outside the area served by the New York City Subway (thus by car), including the Hudson Valley, New Jersey, Connecticut, or the eastern portion of Long Island.

Etymology

Though the term originates from the Triborough Bridge and Tunnel Authority, it has come to encompass all people who commute from outside of New York City proper, including Connecticut, Long Island, New Jersey, and the Hudson Valley. The Oxford Dictionaries explains that a bridge-and-tunnel person is one who lives in the suburbs and is perceived as unsophisticated. However, this is sometimes also used as allusion to New York City's vast transportation system.

Origin
The earliest known instance of this phrase in print is the December 13, 1977, edition of The New York Times:

Comparisons
"Bridge and tunnel" was later adopted in San Francisco in reference to party-goers who live outside San Francisco, as a reference to this original usage. Residents of the Peninsula  and South Bay take commuter trains (Caltrain or BART, each of which has several tunnels) and freeways (I-280 and US 101, which do not) to visit city hot-spots but do not actually live in San Francisco. Residents from the East Bay typically drive or take a bus across the Bay Bridge (and Yerba Buena Tunnel) to reach San Francisco, or take BART through the Transbay Tube.  The commute into San Francisco from Marin County also involves a bridge (the Golden Gate) and the Robin Williams Tunnel.

In Southern California, the term "909er" (a reference to area code 909) has come to have a similar, derogatory meaning for people coming from areas inland of Los Angeles, Orange County, and Riverside County, which historically had the 909 area code.

In Southern Ontario, the term "905er" (a reference to Area Code 905) has come to have a similar meaning for the suburb area surrounding Toronto-proper, including areas such as York Region, Pickering, and Oshawa.

In popular culture

Book publishing
Bridge & Tunnel Books is a literary press in Pittsburgh, Pennsylvania.

 New York Times reporters Jodi Kantor and Megan Twohey described Irwin Reiter, vice president for accounting and financial reporting at the Weinstein Company, as having a "'bridge-and-tunnel' cadence to his speech."

Film
In "Boiler Room (film)" (2000) reference is made to a group, while celebrating Seth's Series 7 in New York, about trying to impress the "bridge and tunnel crowd."
The movie "Loser" (2000) makes a reference to bridge and tunnel girls when one of Jason Biggs's character's ex-roommates calls his girlfriend by that term.
In Nick and Norah's Infinite Playlist (2008), Norah makes a reference to Nick's being "bridge and tunnel", to which Caroline replies, "If he's bridge and tunnel, what does that make us?"
In The Dark Knight (2008), the Joker tricks Gotham into escaping via ferry by having his hostage declare on the news that "...the bridge and tunnel crowd are sure in for a surprise."
In Greenberg (2010), Roger Greenberg, who resides in New York City, doesn't want to go to a bar in Los Angeles on a Friday night because it's "probably full of bridge and tunnel people. Or whatever the L.A. version of bridge and tunnel is."
In Paranoia (2013), Emma makes a reference to Adam's being "bridge and tunnel", after her attempt to lose Adam after their one night stand. 
 Bridge and Tunnel (2014) is a feature film written and directed by Jason Michael Brescia, set on Long Island.

Gaming 

 The term was used in the game to describe the crowd of the Bahama Mamas nightclub in Grand Theft Auto: The Ballad of Gay Tony.

Music
Bridge and Tunnel are a New York City-based punk/post-hardcore band, with a number of releases on the No Idea Records label.
The Honorary Title, a New York City-based rock band, released a song called "Bridge and Tunnel" as a single from their 2004 album Anything Else but the Truth.
Holy Ghost!, a Brooklyn synthpop duo, have a song called "Bridge and Tunnel" on their 2013 album Dynamics.
Sun Kil Moon's Mark Kozelek refers to fans of the band The War on Drugs as being bridge and tunnel people in a 2014 rhetoric song surrounding an on-stage festival incident between the two bands, titled "War on Drugs: Suck My Cock."
The 2018 single Four Out of Five by Arctic Monkeys also features the term in the song's lyrics: "Mr. Bridge and Tunnel on the Starlight Express".

Television
In the first season of the television comedy 30 Rock, Liz Lemon's boyfriend is referred to as being "a little bridge and tunnel."
In the episode "The War at Home" of Law and Order: Criminal Intent, Detective Goren refers to two types that attend the particular night club that the victim did as "Bridge and Tunnel" and Military.
In the pilot episode ("Flowers for Your Grave") of the television show Castle, Rick Castle tells Beckett that she's "not bridge and tunnel [because there is] no trace of the boroughs when you talk."
Bridge and Tunnel is the name of an episode of Marvel's Agent Carter television series.
In the episode "D-Girl" of The Sopranos, an obnoxious patron at a Manhattan bar calls Christopher Moltisanti a "bridge and tunnel boy."
In the episode "Kimmy Kidnaps Gretchen!" of Unbreakable Kimmy Schmidt Titus Andromedon calls Mikey a "bridge and tunnel tadpole".
In the episode "Victoria" of Human Target Chrisopher Chance tells Princess Victoria "I believe the term is: Bridge and Tunnel" 
In the episode "The Anniversary" of Red Oaks Skye tells David that an art friend of hers said he was "bridge and tunnel".
In the episode "Citizen Ship" Of Broad City Iliana and Abbi make fun of "bridge and tunnel bros".
In the episode "Mother of the Year" of Pose (TV series) Elektra refers to customers at Indochine as the "bridge and tunnel crowd".
In the episode "Haven is for Real" of Future Man (TV series) Wolf says to Tiger about Haven "Tiger, this place is bridge and tunnel. Let's bounce."
In the episode Father and the Bride of Gossip Girl (TV series) Blair Waldorf tells Beatrice "I have never been so happy to be surrounded by bridge-and-tunnel types" while partying at Panchito's for her bachelorette party.
 In the opening episode of season 4 of You, the main character Joe makes reference to the ‘bridge & tunnel crowd’ via his internal monologue whilst walking through London.

Theater
Bridge & Tunnel is the title of a 2006 critically acclaimed, Tony Award-winning Broadway play

See also
 Class discrimination
 Culture of New York City
 Economic stratification
 Elitism
 Rankism

References

Class-related slurs
Culture of New York City
Stereotypes